This is an overview of the progression of the Paralympic track cycling record of the women's individual pursuit as recognised by the Union Cycliste Internationale (UCI) and IPC.

Record progressions
WR - denotes a time which was also the world record

C5 Progression

C4 Progression

C3 Progression

C2 Progression

C1 Progression

B Progression

References

Track cycling Olympic record progressions